Saugstad is a Norwegian surname.

Notable people with this surname include:
Elyse Saugstad, American free skier
Ola Didrik Saugstad (born 1947), Norwegian pediatrician
Per Saugstad (1920–2010), Norwegian psychologist

See also
Mount Saugstad, a mountain in British Columbia, Canada
Saugestad

Norwegian-language surnames